A symblepharon is a partial or complete adhesion of the palpebral conjunctiva of the eyelid to the bulbar conjunctiva of the eyeball. It results either from disease (conjunctival sequelae of trachoma) or trauma. Cicatricial pemphigoid and, in severe  cases, rosacea may cause symblepharon. It is rarely congenital. Its treatment is symblepharectomy.

See also
 Ankyloblepharon

References

Further reading

Disorders of conjunctiva